Sören Bertram (born 5 June 1991) is a German professional footballer who plays as a midfielder for VfL Osnabrück.

Career
In January 2019, Bertram joined 2. Bundesliga side SV Darmstadt 98 from league rivals FC Erzgebirge Aue having agreed a 1.5-year contract.

Career statistics

References

External links
 
 
 

1991 births
Living people
People from Uelzen
Footballers from Lower Saxony
German footballers
Germany youth international footballers
Association football midfielders
Bundesliga players
2. Bundesliga players
3. Liga players
Hamburger SV players
Hamburger SV II players
FC Augsburg players
VfL Bochum players
VfL Bochum II players
Hallescher FC players
FC Erzgebirge Aue players
SV Darmstadt 98 players
1. FC Magdeburg players
VfL Osnabrück players